Herbert Silas "Iron Duke" Hall (June 5, 1893 – July 1, 1970) was a Major League Baseball pitcher who played in three games for the Detroit Tigers in .

External links

1893 births
1970 deaths
Detroit Tigers players
Major League Baseball pitchers
Baseball players from Illinois
Denver Bears players
Joplin Miners players
Kansas City Blues (baseball) players
Los Angeles Angels (minor league) players
Modesto Reds players
Phoenix Senators players
Racine Belles (1909–1915) players
Topeka Jayhawks players
Topeka Savages players